Live Overseas is a live album by Adrian Belew recorded after the release of Side One, Side Two and Side Three.

Track listing 
All tracks composed by Adrian Belew; except where noted.
"Writing on the Wall"
"Dinosaur" (Belew, Bruford, Levin, Fripp, Gunn, Mastelotto)
"Ampersand" (4:22)
"Young Lions"
"Beat Box Guitar"
"A Little Madness"
"Drive"
"Neurotica"*
"Of Bow and Drum" (4:48)
"Frame by Frame" (Belew, Bruford, Fripp, Levin) (3:06)
"Three of a Perfect Pair" (Belew, Bruford, Fripp, Levin) (3:49)
"Thela Hun Ginjeet" (Belew, Bruford, Fripp, Levin) (6:19)

Personnel
Adrian Belew - guitar, vocals
 Julie Slick - bass
 Eric Slick - drums

References 

Adrian Belew albums
2009 live albums
albums produced by Adrian Belew